Hafnium carbonitride (HfCN) is a mixed anion chemical compound of hafnium, carbon and nitrogen. With a melting point of above 4,000 °C, it is the most refractory compound known. No other substance has a higher melting point at atmospheric pressure.

In 2015, atomistic simulations predicted that a Hf-C-N material could have a melting point exceeding Ta4Hf1C5 and hafnium carbide by 200 °C. This would later be proven in experimental testing conducted in 2020 by the National University of Science and Technology (NUST) in Moscow.  Samples of both hafnium carbide and hafnium carbonitride were tested in the same environment in which hafnium carbonitride was shown to have a melting point exceeding 4,000 °C, higher than that of hafnium carbide (3,958 °C). More precise testing has yet to be conducted to determine the substance's exact melting point.

References

Hafnium compounds
Carbides
Nitrides